(20 September  1880 – 30 November 1955) was a Japanese academic, politician, political scientist and writer.

Biography 
He graduated from Waseda University in 1905, before graduating from the universities, Chicago and Munich. 
He was described as politically liberal and was quite active in the peace movement. He was a member of the left-leaning Labour-Farmer Party, which advocated universal suffrage, minimum wages, and women's rights, which were non-existent in Japan at that time. Yamamoto Senji, a colleague of his, was assassinated on February 29, on the same day as he had presented testimony in the Japanese Diet regarding torture of prisoners. The Labour-Farmer Party was banned in 1928 due to accusations of having links to communism. Oyama fled Japan in 1933 to the United States as a result. He got a job at Northwestern University at its library and political science department. During his exile, he worked closely with the U.S. Government against the Empire of Japan. He returned to Japan after the end of World War II. He was elected as a member of the House of Councillors in 1951. Oyama happily shook hands with Zhou En-lai, even though Japan and the People's Republic of China did not have diplomatic relations during his lifetime. Oyama was given a Stalin Award prize on December 20, 1951. However, his colleagues begged him not to accept the award for fear that he would become a Soviet puppet. Some of his oldest friends abandoned him when he accepted it. He died of a subdural hematoma during his tenure in 1955.

See also 
Japanese dissidence during the Shōwa period
Labour-Farmer Party

References

Further reading

External links
 Oyama, Ikuo | Portraits of Modern Japanese Historical Figures at the National Diet Library

Japanese politicians
Northwestern University faculty
Stalin Peace Prize recipients
Labour-Farmer Party politicians
Japanese anti-fascists
1880 births
1955 deaths
Politicians from Hyōgo Prefecture